David Masterson (born 13 January 1998) is a South African cricketer. He made his first-class debut for Eastern Province in the 2018–19 CSA 3-Day Provincial Cup on 21 March 2019. He made his List A debut for Eastern Province in the 2018–19 CSA Provincial One-Day Challenge on 24 March 2019.

References

External links
 

1998 births
Living people
South African cricketers
Eastern Province cricketers
Place of birth missing (living people)